Damien Gaudin (born 20 August 1986 in Beaupréau) is a French former road bicycle racer, who competed as a professional from 2008 to 2021. He competed for France at the 2008 Summer Olympics.

Gaudin left  at the end of the 2013 season, and joined  for the 2014 season. He was named in the start list for the 2015 Tour de France and won two combativity awards in the 2018 Tour de France.

Major results

2003
 1st Chrono des Nations Juniors
2004
 3rd Chrono des Nations Juniors
2006
 1st  Madison, National Track Championships (with Thibaut Mace)
 National Under-23 Track Championships
1st  Individual pursuit
1st  Points race
2007
 National Under-23 Track Championships
1st  Individual pursuit
2nd Team pursuit
 1st Paris–Roubaix Espoirs
 2nd Madison, National Track Championships (with Thibaut Mace)
 2nd Overall Tour du Haut-Anjou
 9th Overall Ronde de l'Oise
2008
 1st  Madison, National Track Championships (with Sébastien Turgot)
2009
 National Track Championships
1st  Individual pursuit
2nd Madison (with Jérôme Cousin) 
2010
 National Track Championships
1st  Individual pursuit
1st  Madison (with Benoît Daeninck)
2011
 4th Overall Danmark Rundt
 6th Overall Tour du Poitou-Charentes
2012
 5th Overall Danmark Rundt
 5th Duo Normand (with Sébastien Turgot)
 8th Grote Prijs Jef Scherens
2013
 1st Cholet-Pays de Loire
 1st Prologue Paris–Nice
 5th Paris–Roubaix
2015
 4th Grand Prix de la Somme
 5th Overall Four Days of Dunkirk
2016
 7th Overall Four Days of Dunkirk
2017
 1st Tro-Bro Léon
 1st Stage 6 Tour de Normandie
 1st Stage 4 Tour de Bretagne
 1st Prologue Tour de Luxembourg
 1st Prologue Volta a Portugal
 9th Overall Tour du Poitou-Charentes
2018
 1st Prologue Tour de Luxembourg
 2nd Tro-Bro Léon
 3rd Overall La Tropicale Amissa Bongo
 3rd Le Samyn
 Tour de France
 Combativity award Stages 6 & 9
2019
 9th Overall Tour Poitou-Charentes en Nouvelle-Aquitaine
2020
 8th Overall La Tropicale Amissa Bongo
2021
 2nd Nokere Koerse

Grand Tour general classification results timeline

References

External links
 
 
 
 
 
 

French male cyclists
Sportspeople from Maine-et-Loire
1986 births
Living people
Olympic cyclists of France
Cyclists at the 2008 Summer Olympics
French track cyclists
Cyclists from Pays de la Loire